Teodor Florian (born 1 July 1899; date of death unknown) was a Romanian rugby union footballer. He played as a fullback.

Florian had 4 caps for Romania, with a penalty scored, 3 points in aggregate. His first match was a 59–3 loss to France, on 4 May 1924, at the 1924 Olympic Tournament, and his last came with the 6–0 loss to Germany, on 19 May 1927, in Heidelberg, in a friendly match.

Florian career highest point was his presence at the Romania team that reached the 3rd place at the 1924 Summer Olympics, even losing to France (59–3) and the United States (39–0). He had the honour of scoring his country only points at the tournament as he kicked the penalty that gave Romania a 17–3 result at the half time of the game with the host nation.

See also
 List of Romania national rugby union players

References

External links
 
 
 

1899 births
Year of death missing
Romanian rugby union players
Rugby union fullbacks
Olympic rugby union players of Romania
Rugby union players at the 1924 Summer Olympics
Olympic bronze medalists for Romania
Romania international rugby union players
Medalists at the 1924 Summer Olympics